Waskhaqucha (Quechua waskha (also waska) rope, qucha lake, hispanicized spelling Huascacocha, also Huascocha, a broken word) is a lake in Peru located in the Junín Region, Yauli Province, Morococha District. It lies east of a lake named Waqraqucha.

The Waskhaqucha dam was erected in 1914. It is operated by Centromín Perú.

See also
List of lakes in Peru

References

Lakes of Peru
Lakes of Junín Region
Dams in Peru
Buildings and structures in Junín Region